Holy Name University is a private, Catholic, research, co-educational basic and higher education institution run by the Philippine Southern Province of the  Society of the Divine Word in Tagbilaran City, Bohol, Philippines. It was founded by Fr. Alphonse G. Lesage, SVD a Divine Word Missionary in 1947. It offers programs in elementary, secondary and tertiary levels. Its tertiary offerings include courses in Arts and Sciences (CAS), Education (COED), Nursing, Medical Technology, Radiologic Technology (CHS),Commerce and Accountancy (CBA), Computer Science, Engineering, Information Technology (COECS) and Law (COL) Aside from instruction, HNU engages in research and community extension.

It is accredited by the Commission on Higher Education (CHED), and the Philippine Accrediting Association of Schools, Colleges and Universities (PAASCU).

The school originally had two campuses in Tagbilaran City: the main building (also called Lesage Campus) at the corner of Lesage and Gallares streets and the Janssen Heights Campus in Dampas district. After the October 2013 7.2 magnitude earthquake, the whole operation of the university has been transferred to the Janssen Heights Campus due to the structural damage suffered by the Lesage Campus main building.

History 
Holy Name University was founded in June 1947 by Fr. Alphonse G. Lesage, SVD, a school in Bohol born out of the inspiration of Julio D. Rosales bishop of the Diocese of Tagbilaran. It was opened on July 14, 1947 as a diocesan school owned by the Diocese of Tagbilaran and operated by the Divine Word Missionaries. The school was given the name Holy Name College. In 1963, the SVD gained full ownership of the college. It was renamed Divine Word College of Tagbilaran in recognition of it being a full-fledged SVD school. From 1947 to 1970, it was run by SVD expatriate missionaries. In 1970, Leo D. Ortiz became the first Filipino president. Since then, Filipino priests have overseen its growth. On September 21, 2001, it was given full autonomy by the Commission on Higher Education (CHED). On November 19, 2001, it was granted university status and its name was changed to Holy Name University.

About the University 
The motto of Holy Name University is Benedicite Nomini Eius (English: Blessed be His name).
The HNU seal or logo a blue shield surrounded by an unbroken cord of gold. A gold scroll in the middle contains the motto. The shield has four compartments, each containing an emblem: the three-dimensional triangle (representing the trilogy of education: instruction, research and community extension); the flaming torch (symbol of education and learning); the emblem of the Divine Word (representing both ownership and gratitude to the SVD); and the hills and coconut tree (representing the province of Bohol and beyond). The main colors of the logo are blue, green, and gold.
 The school hymn is the "Holy Name March", written by Elpidio Biliran and his wife.
 The school song is  "I Wanna Be" by Michael Caňares.

Accreditation status 
Level IV PAASCU
 College of Arts and Sciences
 College of Business and Accountancy
 College of Education
Level II PAASCU
 High School Department
 Grade School Department
 Civil Engineering
 Level I PAASCU
 Nursing

Administration

Board of Trustees (2021-2022) 
 Chair: Fr. Roger Bag-ao, SVD
 Vice Chair: Mr. Joseph M. Pernia
 Members:
Fr. Ruel F. Lero, SVD
Fr. Narciso A. Cellan, SVD
Fr. Dionisio M. Miranda, SVD
Fr. Generoso Ricardo B. Rebayla Jr, SVD
Fr. Cyrus Mercado, SVD
Fr. Jerry M. Perocho, SVD
Sr. Eloisa David, OSB 
Dr. Marie Josephine M. De Luna
Corporate Secretary: Fr. Dennis Testado, SVD

Senior administrators
 Fr. Ruel F. Lero, SVD - University President
 Fr. Isagani Ehido, SVD - Vice President for Finance
 Fr. Semie B. Rebayla, SVD - Vice President for Administration
 Fr. Manuel Mijares, SVD - Asst.Vice President for Administration
 Fr. Ramilo V. Mapaye, SVD - Vice President for Academic Affairs

Academic administrators

Principal
Basic Education Department: Dr. Prisciano S. Legitimas

Deans
College of Law: Atty. John  Titus Vistal
College of Arts and Sciences: Dr. Ramon A.Boloron
College of Health Sciences: Ruvih Joy P. Garrote
College of Engineering & Computer Studies: Engr. James P. Uy
College of Business and Accountancy: Dr. Jemma J. Jay
College of Education: Dr. Roque A. Bongcac

Notable alumni 
 Rich Asuncion — actress
 Roberto Cajes — member of the Philippine House of Representatives, representative of the second district of Bohol
 Edgar Chatto — member of the Philippine House of Representatives, representative of the first district of Bohol, former governor of Bohol
 Marjorie Evasco — feminist poet
 Eladio M. Jala — member of the Philippine House of Representatives, representative of the third district of Bohol
 Rene Relampagos — former governor of Bohol, presently representative of the first district of Bohol

References 

Universities and colleges in Bohol
Catholic elementary schools in the Philippines
Catholic secondary schools in the Philippines
Education in Tagbilaran
Educational institutions established in 1946
Catholic universities and colleges in the Philippines
Divine Word Missionaries Order
1946 establishments in the Philippines
Schools in Tagbilaran